This was the first edition of the tournament.

Dustin Brown and Evan King won the title after defeating Hendrik Jebens and Piotr Matuszewski 6–4, 7–5 in the final.

Seeds

Draw

References

External links
 Main draw

Saturn Oil Open - Doubles
Troisdorf Challenger